William Sherman Reese (July 29, 1955 - June 4, 2018) was an American bookseller and founder of the William Reese Company. Over a 44-year career, he became known as a leading figure in the rare book world, with particular expertise in book history and Americana.

Biography 
Reese was born to William Blaine Reese and Katherine Reese (née Jackson) on July 29, 1955, in Havre de Grace, Maryland. He had a sister, Barbara. He attended Gilman School in Baltimore, Maryland, where he was the president of his senior class and from which he graduated in 1973. He then attended Yale.

Reese married Margaret Hurt, who died in 2002. He later married Margaret Hurt's sister, Dorothy Hurt.

Reese died on June 4, 2018.

Bookselling career 
Reese's first bibliographic publications and antiquarian sales occurred while he was an undergraduate at Yale in the mid-1970s. At this time, he was a partner in the rare book firm Frontier Americana. He received a B.A. in history from Yale in 1977. His senior thesis was titled Winnowers of the Past: The Americanist Tradition in the Nineteenth Century. After graduation, Reese worked with bookseller Fred White Jr in Texas.

Reese founded the William Reese Company in 1979, in New Haven, Connecticut. Over the next forty years, the company became the leader in the Americana market, with the best items and the best collections passing through Reese's hands. The company issued hundreds of catalogues of American materials. Reese also worked closely with Yale's Beinecke Rare Book & Manuscript Library to shape their Americana collections.

In 1998, the William Reese Company began offering Fellowships in the Print Culture of the Americas, to fund research in American book history.

Reese was profiled in the 2019 documentary The Booksellers, directed by D.W. Young.

References 

1955 births
2018 deaths
People from Havre de Grace, Maryland
American booksellers
Yale University alumni